An eye examination is a series of tests performed to assess vision and ability to focus on and discern objects. It also includes other tests and examinations pertaining to the eyes. Eye examinations are primarily performed by an optometrist, ophthalmologist, or an orthoptist.
Health care professionals often recommend that all people should have periodic and thorough eye examinations as part of routine primary care, especially since many eye diseases are  asymptomatic.

Eye examinations may detect potentially treatable blinding eye diseases, ocular manifestations of systemic disease, or signs of tumours or other anomalies of the brain.

A full eye examination consists of an external examination, followed by specific tests for visual acuity, pupil function, extraocular muscle motility, visual fields, intraocular pressure and ophthalmoscopy through a dilated pupil.

A minimal eye examination consists of tests for visual acuity, pupil function, and extraocular muscle motility, as well as direct ophthalmoscopy through an undilated pupil.

Basic examination

Visual acuity

Visual acuity is the eyes ability to detect fine details and is the quantitative measure of the eye's ability to see an in-focus image at a certain distance.
The standard definition of normal visual acuity (20/20 or 6/6 vision) is the ability to resolve a spatial pattern separated by a visual angle of one minute of arc.  The terms 20/20 and 6/6 are derived from standardized sized objects that can be seen by a "person of normal vision" at the specified distance.  For example, if one can see at a distance of 20 ft an object that normally can be seen at 20 ft, then one has 20/20 vision.  If one can see at 20 ft what a normal person can see at 40 ft, then one has 20/40 vision.  Put another way, suppose you have trouble seeing objects at a distance and you can only see out to 20 ft what a person with normal vision can see out to 200 feet, then you have 20/200 vision.  The 6/6 terminology is used in countries using the metric system, and that represents the distance in metres.

This is often measured with a Snellen chart or LogMAR chart

Refraction
In physics, "refraction" is the mechanism that bends the path of light as it passes from one medium to another, as when it passes from the air through the parts of the eye. In an eye exam, the term refraction is the determination of the ideal correction of refractive error.  Refractive error is an optical abnormality in which the shape of the eye fails to bring light into sharp focus on the retina, resulting in blurred or distorted vision. Examples of refractive error are myopia, hyperopia, presbyopia and astigmatism. The errors are specified in diopters, in a similar format to an eyeglass prescription. A refraction procedure consists of two parts: objective and subjective.

Objective refraction
An objective refraction is a refraction obtained without receiving any feedback from the patient, using a retinoscope or auto-refractor.

To perform a retinoscopy, the doctor projects a streak of light into a pupil. A series of lenses are flashed in front of the eye. By looking through the retinoscope, the doctor can study the light reflex of the pupil. Based on the movement and orientation of this retinal reflection, the refractive state of the eye is measured.

An auto-refractor is a computerized instrument that shines light into an eye. The light travels through the front of the eye, to the back and then forward through the front again.  The information bounced back to the instrument gives an objective measurement of refractive error without asking the patients any questions.

Subjective refraction

A subjective refraction requires responses from the patient. Typically, the patient will sit behind a phoropter or wear a trial frame and look at an eye chart. The eye care professional will change lenses and other settings while asking the patient for feedback on which set of lenses give the best vision.

Cycloplegic refraction

Sometimes, eye care professionals prefer to obtain a cycloplegic refraction, especially when trying to obtain an accurate refraction in young children who may skew refraction measurements by adjusting their eyes with accommodation. Cycloplegic eye drops are applied to the eye to temporarily paralyze the ciliary muscle of the eye.

Pupil function

An examination of pupilary function includes inspecting the pupils for equal size (1 mm or less of difference may be normal), regular shape, reactivity to light, and direct and consensual accommodation.
These steps can be easily remembered with the mnemonic PERRLA (D+C): Pupils Equal and Round; Reactive to Light and Accommodation (Direct and Consensual).

A swinging-flashlight test may also be desirable if neurologic damage is suspected.
The swinging-flashlight test is the most useful clinical test available to a general physician for the assessment of optic nerve anomalies.
This test detects the afferent pupil defect, also referred to as the Marcus Gunn pupil. It is conducted in a semidarkened room.
In a normal reaction to the swinging-flashlight test, both pupils constrict when one is exposed to light.
As the light is being moved from one eye to another, both eyes begin to dilate, but constrict again when light has reached the other eye.

If there is an efferent defect in the left eye, the left pupil will remain dilated regardless of where the light is shining, while the right pupil will respond normally.
If there is an afferent defect in the left eye, both pupils will dilate when the light is shining on the left eye, but both will constrict when it is shining on the right eye. This is because the left eye will not respond to external stimulus (afferent pathway), but can still receive neural signals from the brain (efferent pathway) to constrict.

If there is a unilateral small pupil with normal reactivity to light, it is unlikely that a neuropathy is present.
However, if accompanied by ptosis of the upper eyelid, this may indicate Horner's syndrome.

If there is a small, irregular pupil that constricts poorly to light, but normally to accommodation, this is an Argyll Robertson pupil.

Ocular motility

Ocular motility should always be tested, especially when patients complain of double vision or physicians suspect neurologic disease.
First, the doctor should visually assess the eyes for deviations that could result from strabismus, extraocular muscle dysfunction, or palsy of the cranial nerves innervating the extraocular muscles.
Saccades are assessed by having the patient move his or her eye quickly to a target at the far right, left, top and bottom. This tests for saccadic dysfunction whereupon poor ability of the eyes to "jump" from one place to another may impinge on reading ability and other skills, whereby the eyes are required to fixate and follow a desired object.

The patient is asked to follow a target with both eyes as it is moved in each of the nine cardinal directions of gaze. The examiner notes the speed, smoothness, range and symmetry of movements and observes for unsteadiness of fixation. These nine fields of gaze test the extraocular muscles: inferior, superior, lateral and medial rectus muscles, as well as the superior and inferior oblique muscles.

Visual field (confrontation) testing

Testing the visual fields consists of confrontation field testing in which each eye is tested separately to assess the extent of the peripheral field.

To perform the test, the individual occludes one eye while fixated on the examiner's eye with the non-occluded eye.
The patient is then asked to count the number of fingers that are briefly flashed in each of the four quadrants.
This method is preferred to the wiggly finger test that was historically used because it represents a rapid and efficient way of answering the same question: is the peripheral visual field affected?

Common problems of the visual field include scotoma (area of reduced vision), hemianopia (half of visual field lost), homonymous hemianopsia and bitemporal hemianopia.

External examination

External examination of eyes consists of inspection of the eyelids, surrounding tissues and palpebral fissure.
Palpation of the orbital rim may also be desirable, depending on the presenting signs and symptoms.
The conjunctiva and sclera can be inspected by having the individual look up, and shining a light while retracting the upper or lower eyelid. The position of the eyelids are checked for abnormalities such as ptosis which is an asymmetry between eyelid positions.

Slit-lamp

Close inspection of the anterior eye structures and ocular adnexa are often done with a slit lamp which is a table mounted microscope with a special adjustable illumination source attached. A small beam of light that can be varied in width, height, incident angle, orientation and colour, is passed over the eye. Often, this light beam is narrowed into a vertical "slit", during slit-lamp examination. The examiner views the illuminated ocular structures, through an optical system that magnifies the image of the eye and the patient is seated while being examined, and the head stabilized by an adjustable chin rest.

This allows inspection of all the ocular media, from cornea to vitreous, plus magnified view of eyelids, and other external ocular related structures. Fluorescein staining before slit lamp examination may reveal corneal abrasions or herpes simplex infection.

The binocular slit-lamp examination provides stereoscopic magnified view of the eye structures in striking detail, enabling exact anatomical diagnoses to be made for a variety of eye conditions.

Also ophthalmoscopy and gonioscopy examinations can also be performed through the slit lamp when combined with special lenses. These lenses include the Goldmann 3-mirror lens, gonioscopy single-mirror/Zeiss 4-mirror lens for (ocular) anterior chamber angle structures and +90D lens, +78D lens, +66D lens & Hruby (-56D) lens, the examination of retinal structures is accomplished.

Intraocular pressure
Intraocular pressure (IOP) can be measured by tonometry devices. The eye can be thought of as an enclosed compartment through which there is a constant circulation of fluid that maintains its shape and internal pressure. Tonometry is a method of measuring this pressure using various instruments. The normal range is 10-21 mmHg.

Retinal examination

Examination of retina (fundus examination) is an important part of the general eye examination. Dilating the pupil using special eye drops greatly enhances the view and permits an extensive examination of peripheral retina. A limited view can be obtained through an undilated pupil, in which case best results are obtained with the room darkened and the patient looking towards the far corner. The appearance of the optic disc and retinal vasculature are also recorded during fundus examination.

A red reflex can be seen when looking at a patient's pupil through a direct ophthalmoscope.  This part of the examination is done from a distance of about 50 cm and is usually symmetrical between the two eyes.  An opacity may indicate a cataract.

Retinal vessel analysis is a non-invasive method to examine the small arteries and veins in the retina which allows to draw conclusions about the morphology and the function of small vessels elsewhere in the human body and is used in particular by cardiologists as well as ophthalmologists.

Eye exams for children 

It is often recommended that children should have their first eye exam at six months old, or earlier if a parent suspects something is wrong with the eyes. Across the world, screening programs are important for identifying children who have a need for spectacles but either do not wear any or have the wrong prescription.

Children need the following basic visual skills for learning:
 Near vision
 Distance vision: Tumbling E chart, Landolt C chart
 Eye teaming (binocularity)
 Eye movement
 Accommodation (focusing skills)
 Peripheral vision
 Eye–hand coordination

Conditions diagnosed during eye examinations 
 Myopia
 Hyperopia
 Presbyopia
 Amblyopia
 Diplopia
 Astigmatism
 Strabismus

Specialized eye examinations 
 Color vision
 Stereopsis
 Near point of convergence
 Keratometry
 Cycloplegic refraction
 Accommodative system
 Amplitude of accommodation
 Negative relative accommodation
 Positive relative accommodation
 Vergence system
 Optokinetic system
 Amsler grid
 Gonioscopy
 Corneal topography
 Corneal pachymetry
 Scheimpflug ocular imaging
 Retinal tomography
 Ocular computed tomography
 Scanning laser polarimetry
 Electrooculography
 Electroretinography
 Ultrasound biomicroscopy
 Maddox rod
 Brock string
 Convergence Testing
 Worth 4 dot test
 Pulfrich effect

See also

 Binocular vision
 Eyeglass prescription
 Orthoptics
 Retinoscopy
 Stereopsis
 Subjective Refraction
 Vergence

References

External links 

 Medscape article on Neuro-ophthalmic examination

Diagnostic ophthalmology
Medical mnemonics
Optometry
Physical examination